Baspa may refer to:

Baspa River, a river in the Himalayas
Baspa Valley, the valley of the Baspa River (also known as the Sangla Valley, after the name of the major town of Sangla located in the valley)
Baspa, a former gossamer-winged butterfly genus (Moore, 1882), now included in the Rapala butterfly genus
Baspa (butterfly), a genus of butterflies in the family Lycaenidae found in South-East Asia
 Baspa melampus, the type species of Baspa